Mgr. Katarína "Katrin" Lengyelová, née Mravcová  (born 11 July 1972) is Slovak TV presenter, journalist and former radio presenter.

In 2001 she graduated of the Faculty of Arts at the Comenius University, Bratislava, with a degree in aesthetics – Slovak language and literature. After she had been working as a reporter and TV news presenter in public television Slovenská televízia (in English Slovak Television) in 2000 – 2002, Lengyelová became presenter of financial and economic news in TA3 (2002 – 2003). In 2005 – 2006 she worked as radio presented in radio B1 and in 2006 – 2008 in radio Jemné Melódie (Soft Melodies).

In 2010 – 2011 she was children helpline consultant at Slovak Committee of UNICEF. In October 2011 she returned to TA3 and started as a presenter of main news, political debates V politike (In Politics) and documentary talkshow Portrét (Portrait) host.

References

External links 
 TA3 Profile (in Slovak)

1972 births
Comenius University alumni
Slovak journalists
Slovak women journalists
Living people
Slovak television presenters
Slovak women television presenters